Manfred "KILI" Kielnhofer (born 28 January 1967 in Haslach an der Mühl) is an Austrian painter, sculptor, designer and photographer. Due to his antisemitic statements in connection with the planned vaccination to contain the COVID-19 pandemic, numerous of his works of art were removed from public space.

Life 
Manfred "KILI" Kielnhofer visited the technical College Linz where he took his final exam in 1995. he was engaged with technique and design and art on building lead him to his special way of art. Since 2000 he lives as a freelance artist in Linz. 2005 he launched Gallery Artpark in Linz.

Work 
Kielnhofer's most famous work is, "Guardians of Time". Drawing on religious and supernatural phenomena, the Guardians of Time are stone statues that are cloaked in hooded robes and situated to seem like they are moving forth in some kind of positive ritual. In some cases the figures stand alone; in other instances, they are grouped together as if whispering to each other. Kielnhofer places his statues in public places like ancient castles, old mines, plazas, and parks. They are installed and moved without fanfare, heightening the eerie, mystic aura they give off. The first of these mysterious figures was created in 2006. Since then, Kielnhofer continues to create and install these statues all over the world. In 2012, the artist created the first of a new series of miniature guardians out of plastic.

In 2009, Kielnhofer developed a new sort of 'act photographs', which involves the construction of a waterplate in his studio, where he can take photos of models sitting or lying down, likely on a mirror.

In 2010 he developed the concept of the Light Art Biennale Austria 2010 with Martina Schettina.

The Interlux-Chair, Kielnhofers artwork shown at the biennial, was registered in the design-database of the MAK, the Museum for Applied Arts in Vienna.

In 2012 Establishment of the first miniature guardian. The mini guardian, limited edition, 54x36x34cm plastic.

In 2013 the first life-sized Guardian in bronze were cast at the art foundry Krismer.

In 2014 the ancient giant people statues 220x220x220cm guardians are shown by the Festival of Lights in Berlin.

In 2015 First works with the glass Berengo Studio Murano Venice.

A fine empty coat were made of white Carrara marble by Studio Massimo Galleni in 2016.

In 2017 the Bike Guardian rider – time traveler started the tour.

Stipends 
 2000 Studies in USA New York, Miami
 2005 Stipend of the county of Upper Austria, Studio at the Egon Schiele Art Center Krumlov CZ
 2007 Symposium – Egon Schiele Art Centrum – Cesky Krumlov 100 years after Egon Schiele
 2008 Symposium of sculpture on wood in Italy Ossana 2008
 2012 International symposium of sculpture Styria, Hartberg "Slow!"

Exhibitions 
 2000–2005: Allerton Art Gallery New York, Gallery Tampere Finland, Citygalerie Linz, Giga Galerie Ansfelden, filmproduction shadow performance main place Linz, biggest children-painting of the world, Galerie Generali Group, Land-culture-project Enns. Front-painting of an ancient house in Traun.
 2006–2007: Gallery Artpark Linz – Skulpture garden Artpark, Gallery Fotopark Linz, "giant ball of integration" on Tournee, Timeguards on tournee
 2008: Egon Schiele Art Centrum (CZ), Gallery Fontaine Amstetten, Black Box Gallery Copenhagen/Linz, art garden Graz; art in the public: Dianabad Wien.
 2009: Cass Sculpture Fondation (UK), Art Vilnius together with Martina Schettina, Franz West and :de:Herbert Brandl, Artfair Berlin-Arttower, Galerie Seywald Salzburg, Mobile-Galerie Hörsching, Woka Lamps Vienna
 2010: Castle Schloss Steyregg near Linz, Neuköllner Kunstsalon Berlin, Galerie Kunst und Handel Graz, Kunstraum Ringstrassen, Light Art Biennale Lichtkunst 2010 Austria, Galerie Claudiana, Area 53 vienna, Citygalerie, Kunsthandel Freller
 2011: Galerie Thiele Linz, Nord Art Germany, Kunstprojekt "ghost car" zur Art Basel, Liste, Scope, Volta Show, Festival of Lights Berlin, Grevenbroich Inseln des Lichtes, Kunsthaus Tacheles Berlin, Kunstverein Passau, ArtStays Ptuj Slovenia, Time guards on tour in Venice
 2012: Designmonat Graz, Galerie Bachlechner, Sculpture show Castle Hartberg "Slow", Ferryman Ferry Basel public Art Basel show, Occupy movement DOCUMENTA (13) Kassel Time guards, Festival of Lights Berlin, Kunstmesse Linz Galerie Thiele, Art & Antiques fair vienna sculpture garden
 2013: Galerie Liebau Burghaun Fulda, Phantasten Museum Wien, Guardians of Time Settle in During Art Dubai, VBKW Künstlerparade Stuttgart, Phantasten Museum Wien, public art show Venice Biennale, SCOPE Art Show Basel Galerie Kunst und Handel, Art Bodensee Galerie Galerie Bachlechner, Austrian contemporary sculptures castle Tabor, Festival of Lights Berlin, art and antiques vienna fair, Kunstmesse Fulda Galerie Liebau, IC contemporary Istanbul art project Galerie Kunst und Handel Graz vienna, Wikam Art&Antiques fair vienna sculpture garden Galerie Kunst und Handel, Art&Antique vienna Hofburg Kunsthandel Freller
 2014: Wiener internationale Kunst & Antiquitätenmesse Kunsthandel Freller, Art&Antique Residenz Salzburg Kunsthandel Freller, Skulpturensommer Galerie Liebau, WIKAM im Schloss Laxenburg Galerie Szaal, Highlights Art Basel public art, Kunst in der Fabrik II im GIZ Rosegg Galerie Kunst und Handel, public art Brussels and Amsterdam, ART Bodensee Galerie Galerie, Art Stays Festival Ptuj Slovenia, Art Salzburg Kunsthandel Freller, Woodlands Waterway Arts Bench Competition, Texas USA, Festival of Lights Berlin, WIKAM Galerie Kunst und Handel, Art&Antique Hofburg Vienna Kunsthandel Freller
 2015: 56th Venice Biennale Of Art, Collateral Event – Personal Structures, Time Space Existence, Palazzo Mora, TRIO Bienal Three-dimensional Rio de Janeiro Biennial, ArtPrize Grand Rapids Michigan USA
 2016: 4th Dubai art award, ArtPrize ArtPrize Grand Rapids Michigan USA, Aktionsraum Linkz, Susan Mains gallery Grenada, Galerie am Museum in Frauenau, Festival of Lights Berlin, Artigo Rio de Janeiro artfair, Light festival Kolding Denmark
 2017: Spotlight Festival Bucharest RO, Muralharbor Linz A, Museum Modern Art Hünfeld D, Guerrilla art documenta Kassel, ArtPrize Grand Rapids Michigan USA, Swell Sculpture Festival Gold Coast AU, Festival of Lights Berlin, Kunst Zürich, Beijing China TaiKooLi mall
 2018: Toronto Light Fest, arte in fiera italia – Kunst und Handel gallery, Lightart Zwickau, Swiss Triennial Festival of Sculpture Bad RagARTz, PAN Awareness Projekt #TheEyeofGuardian Ghana Afrika, Galerie Spittelberg Passage, Festival of Lights Berlin, la Biennale di Arte Salerno Italia, Fair for Art Vienna – art dealer Freller, Graffiti SHED Erich Willner Dorotheum
 2019: Toronto Light Fest, art vienna fair wikam art dealer Freller, Lichtgalerie Cottbus, Art cycling in Millstatt, AKTIONSRAUM LINkZ, European Cultural Centre - Venice Biennial 2019, Artpark Jim Bilgere Manfred Kielnhofer
 2020: Artpark Linz danube event, art vienna fair wikam art dealer Freller, Lichtgalerie Cottbus, la Biennale di Arte Salerno Italia, Art cycling in Millstatt, ArtBiennial Decennial Lightart AT/DK, Steyr city square, castle ruin Waxenberg, Bakehouse Gallery Berlin, The Parliament of Trees by Ben Wagin in Berlin, castle museum Freistadt, 
 2021: Nordart Germany, la Biennale di Arte Salerno Italia, Mausoleum Dessau Jörn Hanitzsch , Tiergarten Aschersleben, Weltfriedakademie Köln, Bergisch Gladbach Rolf Ketan Tepel, NV Center Galerien St. Pölten, Gallery Ibiza North, BIENNALE OF CONTEMPORARY SACRED ART BACS Menton FR
 2022: Recistance Wake up Linz, arts.rip Steyr, Vaccine WILL KILL millions, I am free from guilt, Mudac Swiss museum Lausanne - A chair and you

Publications 
 2005: in the online database of MAK Museum of Applied Arts (Vienna) Design-Info-Pool-Online 2006: Manfred Kielnhofer. Exhibition Catalogue Artpark digitalprint Linz, Gallery ARTpark Lenaupark City Linz.
 2006: Integrationsweltkugel Artpark 
 2007: Timeguards Exhibition Catalog digitalprint Linz, Gallery ARTpark Lenaupark City Linz.
 2008: Masters Contemporary Arts, Collectible Global Art Book 
 2008: Trends Contemporary Arts, Collectible Global Art Book 
 2009: Cass Sculpture Fondation (UK) Manfred Kielnhofer's Timeguards, the Foundation's newest arrivals 2011: NordArt, Kunstwerk Carlshütte 
 2011: LOÖK, Designverständnis eines Bundeslandes 
 2011: Festival of Lights, Berlin Impressionen 2011: 500 x Art in Public, Chris van Uffelen, Braun publishing 
 2012: EYES IN – Collector's 9, World's Innovative Creators & their Masterpieces, Cover pp. 51–58. 
 2012: Kunstforum Bd. 217 dOCUMENTA (13), Ein Rundgang, pp. 80,81. 2012: ST/A/R Printmedium Wien – Berlin, p. 58. 2012: Berliner Morgenpost cover page, Festival of Lights 2013: ice contemporary istanbul art fair magazine, pp. 41–45. 2017: Monopol Magazin, Museumsverwaltung entfernt "Guerrilla Kunst" von Documenta-Standorten 2021: Talking Guardians of Time, Journal Verlag, Re-Creation Report by Andreas Weiskopf, Rolo Geisberger, Manfred Kielnhofer''

References

Press 
 Catalogue Timeguards Gallery Artpark (PDF-file; 3,14 MB)
 Kielnhofer at Gallery Artpark (PDF-file; 2,10 MB)
 Kielnhofer at Gallery Fontaine (PDF-file; 1,88 MB)
 S/T/A/R arts collection at Gallery Artpark (PDF-file; 1,96 MB)
 story at Austria Journal 8/2008 (PDF-file; 171 kB)
 european-art.net | Manfred Kielnhofer
 ice contemporary istanbul art fair magazine page 41-45

External links 

 official Website

1967 births
Living people
People from Rohrbach District
Austrian sculptors
Austrian male sculptors
Postmodern artists
21st-century sculptors
Austrian industrial designers
Austrian furniture designers